Maxwell Abmas (born April 2, 2001) is an American college basketball player for the Oral Roberts Golden Eagles of the Summit League.

High school career
Abmas attended Jesuit College Preparatory School of Dallas. He joined the varsity team in his sophomore season. As a senior, he averaged 19.1 points and 3.7 assists per game. He was named District 9-6A co-MVP. Abmas competed for 3-D Sports on the Amateur Athletic Union circuit. He was lightly recruited and committed to playing college basketball for Oral Roberts over offers from Army, Navy, Air Force and Marist.

College career
As a freshman at Oral Roberts, he was a regular starter and averaged 14.4 points, earning Summit League All-Newcomer Team honors. On December 8, 2020, he recorded 36 points, nine assists and six rebounds in an 83–78 loss to Oklahoma State. On February 13, 2021, Abmas scored a career-high 42 points in a 103–86 win over South Dakota State. Two days later, he was named Lou Henson National Mid-Major Player of the Week. On February 27, Abmas scored 41 points in an 85–81 victory over Western Illinois.

At the close of the 2020–21 season, Abmas was named the Summit League Player of the Year and first-team all-conference. He helped his team win the Summit League tournament, where he was named MVP, and earn an NCAA tournament berth. In the first round of the NCAA Tournament, he led 15th-seeded Oral Roberts to a 75–72 upset win over second-seeded Ohio State in overtime, scoring 29 points. In the second round, Abmas scored 26 points to help upset seventh-seeded Florida, 81–78. In the Sweet 16, Abmas scored 25 points in a 72–70 loss to Arkansas. With this performance, Abmas became the first player to score at least 25 points in each of the first three rounds at a single tournament since Stephen Curry at the 2008 NCAA tournament. His play at the tournament has led many to draw comparisons between him and both Curry and Jimmer Fredette. On May 9, 2021, he declared for the 2021 NBA draft while maintaining his college eligibility. He withdrew from the draft on the day of the deadline.

As a junior, Abmas was named to the First Team All-Summit League.

Career statistics

College

|-
| style="text-align:left;"| 2019–20
| style="text-align:left;"| Oral Roberts
| 31 || 31 || 29.5 || .411 || .366 || .830 || 2.2 || 1.4 || 1.0 || .2 || 14.4
|-
| style="text-align:left;"| 2020–21
| style="text-align:left;"| Oral Roberts
| 28 || 28 || 37.0 || .478 || .433 || .890 || 3.2 || 3.8 || 1.5 || .2 || style="background:#cfecec;" | 24.6*
|-
| style="text-align:left;"| 2021–22
| style="text-align:left;"| Oral Roberts
| 30 || 30 || 36.8 || .422 || .389 || .850 || 3.4 || 3.7 || 1.0 || .1 || 22.8
|- class="sortbottom"
| style="text-align:center;" colspan="2"| Career
| 89 || 89 || 34.8 || .437 || .394 || .865 || 2.9 || 2.9 || 1.1 || .2 || 20.4

See also
 List of NCAA Division I men's basketball season scoring leaders
 List of NCAA Division I men's basketball career 3-point scoring leaders

References

External links
Oral Roberts Golden Eagles bio

2001 births
Living people
All-American college men's basketball players
American men's basketball players
Basketball players from Texas
Jesuit College Preparatory School of Dallas alumni
Oral Roberts Golden Eagles men's basketball players
People from Rockwall, Texas
Point guards
Shooting guards
Sportspeople from the Dallas–Fort Worth metroplex